The following is the list of awards and nominations received by actress and filmmaker Jodie Foster. 
One of the most awarded thespians of her generation, Foster in her five decades long career has received numerous accolades; both competitive and honorary. Her major competitive wins include two Academy Awards, three Golden Globe Awards, three British Academy Film Awards, an Independent Spirit Award, and a Screen Actors Guild Award. She has also been nominated twice for the Primetime Emmy Award and once for the Daytime Emmy Award.

Academy Awards
The Academy Awards are a set of awards given by the Academy of Motion Picture Arts and Sciences annually for excellence of cinematic achievements. Foster has won two awards from four nominations. Foster holds the distinction of being the youngest two-time Oscar winner and one of only two people to win multiple Oscars before the age 30. Foster is also the only openly LGBTQ woman to win two Academy Awards for acting.

AARP's Movies for Grownup Awards
AARP (American Association of Retired Persons) is a United States-based interest group whose stated mission is "to empower people to choose how they live as they age." Foster has received one award from two nominations.

Alliance of Women Film Journalists Awards
The Alliance of Women Film Journalists (AWFJ) is a non-profit founded in 2006 based out of New York City, United States, dedicated to supporting work by and about women in the film industry

American Cinematheque Award
The American Cinematheque Award annually honors "an extraordinary artist in the entertainment industry who is fully engaged in his or her work and is committed to making a significant contribution to the art of the motion pictures".

American Comedy Awards
The American Comedy Awards are a group of awards established in 1987 and presented annually in the United States recognizing performances and performers in the field of comedy, with an emphasis on television comedy and comedy films.

AFI Conservatory
The American Film Institute is a private not-for-profit graduate film school in the Hollywood Hills district of Los Angeles. Students (called "Fellows") learn from the masters in a collaborative, hands-on production environment with an emphasis on storytelling. The Conservatory is a program of the American Film Institute founded in 1969. In 2018, Foster was honoured with the conservatory's honorary degree for her career achievements.

American Society of Cinematographers
American Society of Cinematographers is a cultural, educational, and professional organisation that is nor a labour union or a guild. The society was founded in Hollywood in 1919 and was organised with a purpose to not only progress and advance the science and art of cinematography, but also gather a wide range of cinematographers together to collaboratively discuss and exchange techniques, ideas and advocate motion pictures as a type of art form.

Athena Film Festival
The Athena Film Festival is an annual film festival held at Barnard College of Columbia University in New York City. The festival takes place in February and focuses on films celebrating women and leadership. In addition to showing films, the festival hosts filmmaker workshops, master classes and panels on a variety of topics relevant to women in the film industry.

Berlin International Film Festival
The Berlin International Film Festival, usually called the Berlinale, is a film festival held annually in Berlin, Germany. Founded in West Berlin in 1951, the festival has been held every February since 1978.

Boston Film Festival
Boston Film Festival is an annual film festival held in Boston in the U.S. state of Massachusetts. It has been held annually since 1984, usually in early September. Foster was the inaugural recipient of the festival's honorary award for film excellence as well as the youngest recipient, receiving the honor at age 28.

Boston Society of Film Critics
The Boston Society of Film Critics (BSFC) is an organization of film reviewers from Boston, Massachusetts in the United States. The BSFC was formed in 1981 to make “Boston’s unique critical perspective heard on a national and international level by awarding commendations to the best of the year’s films and filmmakers and local film theaters and film societies that offer outstanding film programming”. Foster has won the award from the organisation once and has been a runner-up thrice.

Blockbuster Entertainment Awards
The Blockbuster Entertainment Awards was a film awards ceremony, founded by Blockbuster Entertainment Inc., that ran from 1995 until 2001. The awards were produced by Ken Ehrlich every year.

Bravo Otto Awards
The Bravo Otto is a German accolade honoring excellence of performers in film, television and music.  Established in 1957, the award is presented annually, with winners selected by the readers of Bravo magazine. Foster has received one award.

Britannia Awards
The Britannia Awards are presented by BAFTA Los Angeles, a branch of the British Academy of Film and Television Arts (BAFTA), as "a bridge between the Hollywood and British production and entertainment business communities." Established in 1989, it honors "individuals and companies who have dedicated their careers or corporate missions to advancing the art-forms of the moving image."

British Academy Film Awards
The British Academy Film Awards are presented in an annual award show hosted by the British Academy of Film and Television Arts (BAFTA), as the British equivalent of the Oscars. The ceremony used to take place in April or May, but from 2002 onwards it takes place in February in order to precede the Academy Awards in the United States. Foster has been nominated five times, winning thrice. Moreover, her win at the age of 13 in the Best Supporting Actress category made her the youngest BAFTA recipient.

Cable ACE Awards

Cannes Film Festival
The Cannes Film Festival, is an annual film festival held in Cannes, France, which previews new films of all genres, including documentaries, from all around the world. Founded in 1946, the invitation-only festival is held annually (usually in May) at the Palais des Festivals et des Congrès.

Chicago Film Critics Association
The Chicago Film Critics Association (CFCA) is an association of professional film critics, who work in print, broadcast and online media, based in Chicago, Illinois, United States. The organization was founded in 1990 by film critics Sharon LeMaire and Sue Kiner, following the success of the first Chicago Film Critics Awards given out in 1988. The association compromises 60 members. Foster has received the award from the association once from four nominations.

Chicago International Film Festival
The Chicago International Film Festival is an annual film festival held every fall. Founded in 1964 by Michael Kutza, it is the longest-running competitive film festival in North America. At the age of 32, Foster became the youngest recipient of the festival's lifetime achievement award.

Dallas–Fort Worth Film Critics Association
The Dallas–Fort Worth Film Critics Association is an organization of 31 print, radio/TV and internet journalists from Dallas–Fort Worth metroplex-based publications. Foster has won two awards from the organisation.

David di Donatello Awards
The David di Donatello (Italian: Ente David di Donatello), named after Donatello's David, is a film award presented each year for cinematic performances and production by L'accademia del Cinema Italiano (ACI) ( The Academy of Italian Cinema). There are 24 categories as of 2006. Italy is also famed for its annual Venice Film Festival. Foster has won four David, with three wins for Best Foreign Actress, she is the most awarded woman in the category.

Daytime Emmy Awards
The Daytime Emmy Award is an American accolade bestowed by the New York–based National Academy of Television Arts and Sciences in recognition of excellence in American daytime television programming. Ceremonies generally are held in May or June. Foster has been nominated once.

Detroit Film Critics Society 
The Detroit Film Critics Society is a film critic organization based in Detroit, Michigan, United States. It was founded in 2007 and comprises a group of over twenty film critics. Foster has received one award.

Directors Guild of America Awards
The Directors Guild of America Awards are issued annually by the Directors Guild of America. The first DGA Award was an “Honorary Life Member” award issued in 1938 to D. W. Griffith. The statues are made by New York firm, Society Awards. Foster has received two nominations.

Dorian Awards
The Dorian Awards are an annual endeavor organized by GALECA: The Society of LGBTQ Entertainment Critics (founded in 2009 as the Gay and Lesbian Entertainment Critics Association). Foster has received one nomination.

Elle Women in Hollywood Awards
The Elle Women in Hollywood Awards are an annual award ceremony presented by Elle, honoring women from different fields of entertainment industry for their contributions.

European Film Awards
The European Film Awards have been presented annually since 1988 by the European Film Academy to recognize excellence in European cinematic achievements. The awards are given in over ten categories, of which the most important is the Best Film. They are restricted to European cinema and European producers, directors, and actors. Foster has received one award

Fangoria Chainsaw Awards 
The Fangoria Chainsaw Awards are an award ceremony that goes out to horror films and thriller films. Beginning in 1992 the awards were expanded and an annual ceremony was inaugurated to give out the awards. Foster has received one award.

Globes de Cristal Awards
The Globes de Cristal Awards is a set of awards bestowed by members of the French Press Association recognizing excellence in home art and culture. The annual formal ceremony and dinner at which the awards are presented happens each February. Foster has been nominated once.

Golden Apple Award
The Golden Apple Award was an American award presented to entertainers by the Hollywood Women's Press Club, usually in recognition not of performance, but of behavior. The award was presented from 1941 until 2001, when the Hollywood Women's Press Club became inactive. The awards ceremony included Golden Apples to recognize actors for being easy to work with.

Golden Globe Awards
The Golden Globe Award is an accolade presented by the members of the Hollywood Foreign Press Association (HFPA) to recognize excellence in film and television, both domestic and foreign. The formal ceremonies are presented annually as a major part of the film industry's awards season, culminating each year with the Oscars. Foster has received eleven nominations and has won four (three competitive and one honorary). At the age of 50, Foster became the 4th youngest recipient of the Cecil B. DeMille Award.

Goldene Kamera Awards
The Goldene Kamera is an annual German film and television award, awarded by the Funke Mediengruppe. The gold-plated silver award model was created by Berlin artist Wolfram Beck. It is 25 centimeters (approximately 10 inches) high and weighs around 900 grams. Foster has received one award.

Hamburg International Film Festival
Filmfest Hamburg is an international film festival, the third-largest of its kind in Germany (after Berlin and Munich). It shows national and international feature and documentary films in eleven sections. The range of the program stretches from art house films to innovative mainstream cinema, presenting the first feature films of young unknown directors together with films by internationally established directors.

Hasty Pudding Theatricals
The Hasty Pudding Woman of the Year award is bestowed annually by the Hasty Pudding Theatricals society at Harvard University. Created in 1951, it has since been awarded annually by the society members of the Hasty Pudding to performers deemed to have made a "lasting and impressive contribution to the world of entertainment."

Hollywood Film Awards
The Hollywood Film Awards are an American motion picture award ceremony held annually since 1997, usually in October or November. The gala ceremony takes place at the Beverly Hilton Hotel in Beverly Hills, California.

Irish Film & Television Academy Awards
The Irish Film & Television Academy (IFTA) is an all-Ireland organization focused on film and television.  It has about 1000 members and is based in Dublin with branches in London and Los Angeles. Foster has been nominated once.

Jupiter Awards
The Jupiter Award is a German annual cinema award. It is Germany's biggest audience award for cinema and TV and is awarded annually by Cinema magazine and TV Spielfilm in eleven categories. Foster has won four awards from seven nominations.

Independent Spirit Awards
The Independent Spirit Awards (originally known as the FINDIE or Friends of Independents Awards), founded in 1984, are awards dedicated to independent filmmakers. Winners are typically presented with acrylic glass pyramids containing suspended shoestrings representing the paltry budgets of independent films. Foster has received one award.

Kansas City Film Critics Circle
The Kansas City Film Critics Circle (KCFCC) is a group of media film critics in the Kansas City metropolitan area. James Loutzenhiser, a local psychiatrist and film buff, who died in November 2001, founded the group in 1967. The annual film awards are now called "The Loutzenhiser Awards".

Los Angeles Film Critics Association
The Los Angeles Film Critics Association (LAFCA) is an American film critic organization founded in 1975. Its membership comprises film critics from Los Angeles-based print and electronic media. Foster has received the award from the association once and has been the runner-up four times.

London Film Critics Circle
The London Film Critics' Circle is the name by which the Film Section of The Critics' Circle is known internationally. Founded in 1913, it is an association for working British critics. Foster has been nominated once.

MTV Movie Awards
The MTV Movie Awards is a film awards show presented annually on MTV. The nominees are decided by producers and executives at MTV. Winners are decided online by the general public. Foster has been nominated once.

National Board of Review
The National Board of Review of Motion Pictures is an organization in the United States dedicated to discussing and selecting what its members regard as the best film works of each year. Foster has received one award.

National Society of Film Critics
The National Society of Film Critics (NSFC) is an American film critic organization. The organization is known for its highbrow tastes, and its annual awards are one of the most prestigious film critics awards in the United States. Foster is awarded once by the society and has been a runner-up thrice.

New York Film Critics Circle
The New York Film Critics Circle (NYFCC) is an American film critic organization founded in 1935 by Wanda Hale from the New York Daily News. Its membership includes over 30 film critics from New York-based daily and weekly newspapers, magazines, online publications. Foster is awarded once by the organisation and has been a runner-up thrice.

New York Women in Film and Television
New York Women in Film & Television (NYWIFT) is a nonprofit membership organization for professional women in film, television and digital media. A champion of women's rights, achievements and points of view in the film and television industry, NYWIFT is an educational forum for media professionals, and a network for the exchange of information and resources.

Online Film & Television Association Awards

People's Choice Awards
The People's Choice Awards, is an American awards show, recognizing people in entertainment, voted online by the general public and fans. The show has been held annually since 1975. Foster has received the award once and has been nominated four times.

Primetime Emmy Awards
The Primetime Emmy Awards, considered as a TV equivalent to the Academy Awards for film in the U.S., are presented by the Academy of Television Arts & Sciences (ATAS), the National Academy of Television Arts and Sciences (NATAS), and the International Academy of Television Arts and Sciences in various sectors of the television industry including entertainment programming, news and documentary shows. Currently three annual ceremonies are held; for Primetime Emmy Awards (since 1949), Daytime Emmy Awards (since 1974), and International Emmy Awards (since 1973).

Rembrandt Awards
The Rembrandt Awards were a Dutch film award created in 1993. Foster received one award.

San Diego Film Critics Society
The San Diego Film Critics Society (SDFCS) is an organization of film reviewers from San Diego-based publications. Foster has received one nomination.

Santa Barbara International Film Festival
The Santa Barbara International Film Festival (SBIFF) is an eleven-day film festival held in Santa Barbara, California since 1986. Foster has been awarded once by the festival.

Satellite Awards
The Satellite Awards are annual awards given by the International Press Academy that are commonly noted in entertainment industry journals and blogs.

Saturn Awards
The Academy of Science Fiction, Fantasy and Horror Films (ASFFF) presents each year the Saturn Awards, which honor the top works in science fiction, fantasy, and horror in film, television and home video since 1972. Foster has been nominated for a leading five Best Actress awards and has won twice, more than anyone else.

Sant Jordi Awards
The Sant Jordi Awards are film prizes awarded annually in Barcelona by the Catalonia region of the Spanish radio network RNE. Foster has received one nomination.

Southeastern Film Critics Association

ShoWest Convention
ShoWest Convention was formerly one of four major worldwide annual events owned by the Film Group unit of Nielsen Business Media before being sold in 2011 to e5 Global Media and operated exclusively by NATO. Now known as CinemaCon it is presented by the National Association of Theatre Owners.

Sitges - Catalonian International Film Festival
The Sitges Film Festival is a Spanish film festival and one of the world's foremost international festivals specializing in fantasy and horror films. Established in 1968, the festival normally takes place every year in early October in the coastal resort of Sitges, 34 kilometers West-South-West of the city of Barcelona, Catalonia (Spain).

Screen Actors Guild Awards
The Screen Actors Guild Awards, the only national network television show to acknowledge the work of union members and one of the major awards events in Hollywood since 1995, is an accolade given by the Screen Actors Guild (SAG) to recognize outstanding performances by its members. Foster has won the award once.

St. Louis Gateway Film Critics Association
The St. Louis Film Critics Association (SLFCA) is an organization of film critics operating in Greater St. Louis and adjoining areas of Missouri and Illinois which was founded in 2004. Foster has been nominated once.

Telluride Film Festival
The Telluride Film Festival is a film festival which was established in 1974 and is held annually in Telluride, Colorado during Labor Day weekend.

T.V. Land Awards

Women in Film Crystal + Lucy Awards
The Women in Film Crystal + Lucy Awards were first presented in 1977 by the now–Los Angeles chapter of the Women in Film organization—are presented to honor women in communications and media. The Crystal Award honors outstanding women who, through their endurance and the excellence of their work, have helped to expand the role of women within the entertainment industry.

Women's Image Network Awards
Women's Image Network (WIN), was founded in 1993 to promote gender parity by filmmaker Phyllis Stuart. This company became successful from the ongoing support, advice and assistance provided by seasoned entertainment professionals including Sherry Lansing and Arthur Hiller, just two of the illustrious WIN founding advisory board members. Foster has received one nomination.

Young Artist Awards
The Young Artist Awards (originally known as the Youth In Film Award) is an accolade bestowed by the Young Artist Association, a non-profit organization founded in 1978 to honor excellence of youth performers, and to provide scholarships for young artists who may be physically and/or financially challenged. Foster has received one nomination.

20/20 Awards

Hollywood Walk of Fame

See also
 Jodie Foster filmography

Notes

References

Foster, Jodie